Melrose Rugby Football Club is a rugby union club located in the town of Melrose in the Scottish Borders. The club plays at the Greenyards.

History

The club was formed in 1877 and was elected to full membership of the Scottish Rugby Union in 1880. The club have played at the Greenyards since the club's inception.

Melrose have been Scottish champions on nine occasions and Scottish cup winners three times. They lifted the Scottish Cup in 1997 to complete a domestic double and have also won the Border League on 17 occasions.

Despite the population of Melrose hovering around 2000 for a number of years the team has been a consistently successful club in the upper echelons of the Scottish game.

Current squad

Edinburgh Rugby players drafted:

  Jaco Van der Valt       Luan de Bruin
  Charlie Sheil           Nick Aurelic

Table

Teams

As well as the Super 6 and 1st XV, Melrose have a youth side (Melrose WASPS) and a reserve side (Melrose Storm). The club had a successful Ladies side until 2018.

Melrose Ladies

Melrose Ladies was one of the top women's teams in Scotland, competing in the Scottish Premiership and the Scottish Cup. The team produced a number of players who went on to represent Scotland. Four members of the current Scotland squad – Lisa Thomson, Lana Skeldon, Lauren Harris and Chloe Rollie – played at Melrose. The team folded in 2018.

Melrose Wasps

There is an under 18s team called Melrose Wasps, formerly coached by the famous Jim Telfer now by Jerry Brett and Nick Alston . Traditionally over the seasons this team has been very competitive in the local Borders League as well as being a top Scottish U18 side playing the best XV's in the country as well as touring overseas (Monaco in 2018).{[cn}}
Melrose Rugby club also have an under-16, under-15, S2, S1, and then all primary ages groups however only start playing matches at Primary 4. The girls section – called the Queen Bees – involves girls from P4-P7. There is a very strong partnership with feeder school Earlston HS.

Melrose Storm

Melrose's reserve side is known as the Melrose Storm. They broke records by winning the National Reserve League three seasons in a row (2016, 2017 & 2018). They currently play in the top 2nd XV League in Scotland against sides such as Heriots Blues, Stewarts Melville, Hawick, Gala, Edinburgh Accies.

Sevens tournament

Melrose is most famous as the host of the first-ever rugby sevens tournament in 1883, the abbreviated game having been invented by Ned Haig, a local butcher. The first Melrose Sevens was won by Melrose, beating local rivals Gala in the final during extra time. The Melrose Sevens, played on the second Saturday in April every year, remains the most popular Scottish Sevens tournament, regularly attracting crowds in excess of 10,000. In honour of the role of Melrose RFC in the creation of rugby sevens, the club was inducted along with Haig to the IRB Hall of Fame in 2008.
Melrose have had some recent success in their home tournament, coming runner-up on a couple of occasions and winning it in 2011. In 2010 they were crowned Kings of the Sevens winning the Kelso, Earlston, Gala and Jedforest sevens and placing respectably in the others.

The stadium
Melrose play at the Greenyards. They have played here since the club was formed. The grandstand has wooden benches and is painted in the club colours; yellow and black.

In 2019 the famous turf of The Greenyards was replaced with a 4G pitch.

Notable former players

Scotland internationalists

Olympic Games
Mark Robertson Great Britain, Silver Medal, Rugby Sevens 2012

South of Scotland

The following former Melrose players have represented South of Scotland at provincial level.

Youth rugby
There is an under 18s team called Melrose Wasps, formerly coached by the famous Jim Telfer and now by Jerry Brett and Nick Alston. This XV plays some of the very best XV's from clubs and schools in Scotland, as well as touring over seas (Monaco 2018).
Melrose rugby club also have an under-16, under-15, S2, S1, and then all primary ages groups however only start playing matches at Primary 4. The girls section - called the Queen Bees - involves girls from P4-P7.
There is Avery strong partnership with catchment school Earlston HS.

Honours

Men's

 Scottish Premiership
 Champions (10): 1989–90, 1991–92, 1992–93, 1993–94, 1995–96, 1996–97, 2010–11, 2011–12, 2013–14, 2017–18
 Runners-Up (2): 2014–15, 2016–17
 Scottish Cup
 Champions (4): 1996–97, 2007–08, 2016–17, 2017-18
 Runners-Up (6): 2000–01, 2008–09, 2009–10, 2010–11, 2012–13, 2015–16
 Kelso Sevens
 Champions (18): 1932, 1933, 1937, 1946, 1947, 1949, 1950, 1952, 1974, 1980, 1988, 1998, 2009, 2011, 2014, 2015, 2016, 2018
 Langholm Sevens
 Champions (9): 1933, 1947, 1950, 1952, 1963, 1992, 1999, 2002, 2014
 Melrose Sevens
 Champions (12): 1883, 1885, 1889, 1931, 1947, 1948, 1950, 1952, 1975, 1997, 1998, 2011
 Hawick Sevens
 Champions (4): 1910, 1958, 1974, 2014
 Gala Sevens
 Champions (10): 1886, 1889, 1938, 1953, 1962, 1987, 1999, 2000, 2010, 2011
 Berwick Sevens
 Champions (1): 2002
 Jed-Forest Sevens
 Champions (11): 1908, 1909, 1910, 1964, 1999, 2003, 2005, 2010, 2011, 2014, 2018
 Peebles Sevens
 Champions (13): 1932, 1960, 1968, 1970, 1971, 1976, 1979, 2009, 2010, 2013, 2014, 2016, 2018
 Selkirk Sevens
 Champions (12): 1932, 1946, 1951, 1961, 1965, 1985, 1995, 1998, 2000, 2014, 2016, 2017
 Earlston Sevens
 Champions (21): 1949, 1950, 1951, 1957, 1965, 1972, 1977, 1979, 1982, 1985, 1986, 1990, 1996, 2002, 2010, 2011, 2012, 2013, 2014, 2015, 2018
Melrose hold the record of most consecutive victories in the tournament (6): 2010, 2011, 2012, 2013, 2014, 2015
 Kings of the Sevens
 Champions (8): 1999, 2000, 2002, 2005, 2010, 2011, 2013, 2014
 Walkerburn Sevens
 Champions (6): 1932, 1947, 1975, 1987, 2010, 2013

Melrose Storm

 Walkerburn Sevens
 Champions (2): 2018, 2019

See also
 Scottish Premiership Division One
 Border League
 Borders Sevens Circuit

References

 Bath, Richard (ed.) The Complete Book of Rugby (Seven Oaks Ltd, 1997 )

External links

 Melrose Sevens

Scottish rugby union teams
Rugby union clubs in the Scottish Borders
Rugby clubs established in 1877
World Rugby Hall of Fame inductees
Melrose, Scottish Borders
1877 establishments in Scotland